The Sudan blind snake (Tricheilostoma dissimilis) is a species of snake in the family Leptotyphlopidae.

References

Endemic fauna of Sudan
Tricheilostoma
Reptiles described in 1886